Neil Rautenbach (born 17 May 1991 in Cape Town, South Africa) is a Namibian South African-born rugby union player for the  in the Currie Cup and the Rugby Challenge. His regular position is hooker.

Career

Youth and Varsity Cup rugby

He represented Western Province at high school level, playing for their Under-16 side at the Grant Khomo Week in 2007 and for their Under-18 Craven Week side in 2009. He joined their academy and played for the  side in the 2010 Under-19 Provincial Championship and for the  side in the 2011 and 2012 Under-21 Provincial Championships.

He also played Varsity Cup rugby for the  since 2011, winning the competition with them twice in 2011 (during which he made just one appearance, but was named on the bench for the final) and 2014, when he made nine appearances and played the first 72 of the final as they secured a dramatic 39–33 comeback victory.

Western Province

That turned out to be his only appearance in the competition, as  lost 13–8.

Free State Cheetahs

Representative rugby

In October 2014, Rautenbach was called up to the n national team for the first time prior to their end-of-year tour to Europe.

References

South African rugby union players
Living people
1991 births
Rugby union players from Cape Town
Rugby union hookers
Western Province (rugby union) players